The Church of St Martin is an ancient Church of England parish church in Canterbury, England, situated slightly beyond the city centre. It is recognised as the oldest church building in Britain still in use as a church, and the oldest existing parish church in the English-speaking world, although Roman and Celtic churches had existed for centuries. The church is, along with Canterbury Cathedral and St Augustine's Abbey, part of a World Heritage Site.

Since 1668 the church has been part of the benefice of St Martin and St Paul Canterbury. Both St Martin's and nearby St Paul's churches are used for weekly services. The current rector of the parish is the Reverend Mark Richard Griffin.

Early history 
St Martin's was the private chapel of Queen Bertha of Kent (died in or after 601) before Saint Augustine of Canterbury arrived from Rome in 597. Queen Bertha was a Christian Frankish princess who arrived in England with her chaplain, Bishop Liudhard. Her pagan husband, King Æthelberht of Kent, facilitated her in continuing to practise her religion by renovating a Romano-British building (ca. AD 580). The Venerable Bede says the building had been in use in the late Roman period but had fallen into disuse. As Bede specifically names it, this church was dedicated to Saint Martin of Tours, a city located near where Bertha grew up. Although Bede implies that the building in Roman times had been a church, modern scholarship has questioned this and also whether it was a former Roman structure at all, suggesting that it could have been sixth century but built in the Roman way.

Upon his arrival, Augustine used St Martin's as his mission headquarters, immediately enlarging it (AD 597), and King Æthelberht was soon baptised here. With the subsequent establishments of Canterbury Cathedral and St Augustine's Abbey, St Martin's lost prestige but retains its priority and historical importance.

Shortly before 1844, a hoard of gold coins which may date from the late 6th century was found in the churchyard, one of which is the Liudhard medalet, which bears an image of a diademed figure with a legend referring to Liudhard.

Architecture 

Local finds prove that Christianity did exist in this area of the city at the time, and the church contains many reused Roman bricks or spolia, as well as complete sections of walls of Roman tiles. At the core of the church the brick remains of a Roman tomb were integrated into the structure. Several sections of walls are clearly very early, and it is possible that a blocked square-headed doorway in the chancel was the entrance to Bertha's church, while other sections of wall come from the period after the Gregorian mission in the 7th or 8th centuries, including most of the nave. The apse that was originally at the east end has been removed. The tower is much later, in Perpendicular style. The church is a Grade I listed building.

Graves 
The churchyard contains the graves of many notable local families and well-known people including Thomas Sidney Cooper, RA (artist) and Mary Tourtel, the creator of Rupert Bear.

Music 
The church has a continuing musical tradition from the monks of St Augustine to the present day. The choral director for the parish is Dom del Nevo.

The tower has three bells set for swing-chiming, using levers.  The tenor weighs .

References

Sources 
F. Haverfield, "Early British Christianity" The English Historical Review Vol. 11, No. 43. (Jul., 1896)
Service, Alastair, The Buildings of Britain, A Guide and Gazetteer, Anglo-Saxon and Norman, 1982, Barrie & Jenkins (London),

External links 

Canterbury Buildings
Website of St Martin's Church
Triadic UNESCO World Heritage property, "Canterbury Cathedral, St Augustine's Abbey, and St Martin's Church"

Standing Anglo-Saxon churches
Saint Martin's Church
World Heritage Sites in England
Church of England church buildings in Kent
6th-century churches
Grade I listed churches in Kent
6th-century establishments in England
Diocese of Canterbury